This is a summary of the year 2012 in the Canadian music industry.

Events
February 13 – The Canadian Broadcasting Corporation launches CBC Music, a digital music service which offers streaming audio broadcasts of 40 different music genre channels, in addition to the existing CBC Radio 2 and CBC Radio 3 services, on both the Internet and iOS devices.
April 1 – Juno Awards of 2012
June 14 – Prelimimary longlist for the 2012 Polaris Music Prize is announced.
July 17 – Shortlist for the 2012 Polaris Music Prize is announced.
September 24 – Feist's album Metals is announced as the winner of the Polaris Music Prize.

Bands on hiatus
Karkwa

Albums released

A
Amos the Transparent, Goodnight My Dear, I'm Falling Apart (February 14)
Amylie, Le Royaume
Androgynous Mind, Nightstalker
Apollo Ghosts, Landmark
Marie-Pierre Arthur, Aux alentours
Azari & III, Azari & III

B
Baby Eagle and the Proud Mothers, Bone Soldier (March 6)
Bahamas, Barchords (February 7)
Del Barber, Headwaters
Bidiniband, In the Rock Hall (January 24)
Justin Bieber, Believe
Billy Talent,  Dead Silence, September 9, 2012
The Birthday Massacre, Hide and Seek (October 9)
Boxer the Horse, French Residency
Brasstronaut, Mean Sun (May 15)

C
Cadence Weapon, Hope in Dirt City (May 29)
Cancer Bats, Dead Set on Living
Caracol, Shiver
 Paul Cargnello, Papa Paul
Change of Heart, There You Go '82 – '97 (September 18, 2012)
Tim Chaisson, The Other Side (September 25)
The City Streets, White Lightning (spring)	
The City Streets, Sawdust & Rum (spring)
Leonard Cohen, Old Ideas (January 31)
Cold Specks, I Predict a Graceful Expulsion (May 21)
Cookie Duster, When Flying Was Easy (June)
Ève Cournoyer, Le labeur d'une fleur
Rose Cousins, We Have Made a Spark
Cuff the Duke, In Our Time (April 12)
Cuff the Duke, Union (October 2)
Amelia Curran, Spectators (October 2)

D
Daphni, Jiaolong
Diamond Rings, Free Dimensional
Digawolf, Naka De
Céline Dion, Sans attendre
Julie Doiron, So Many Days (October 23)
Dumas, L'Heure et l'endroit
Durham County Poets, Where the River Flows
Dusted, Dusted

E
Kathleen Edwards, Voyageur (January 17)
Coral Egan, The Year He Drove Me Crazy
The Elwins, And I Thank You (February 21)
Quique Escamilla, Quique Escamilla
Esthero, Everything Is Expensive (October 30)
Evening Hymns, Spectral Dusk

F
Jeremy Fisher, Mint Juleps
Front Line Assembly, AirMech (November 13)
Nelly Furtado, The Spirit Indestructible (September 18)

G
Gentleman Reg, Leisure Life
Hannah Georgas, Hannah Georgas
Ghostkeeper, Horse Chief! War Thief!
Jenn Grant, The Beautiful Wild (September 25)
Great Lake Swimmers, New Wild Everywhere (April 3)
Grey Kingdom, The Weeping Suns; Light, I'll Call Your Name Out "Darkness"
Grimes, Visions (February 21)
Godspeed You! Black Emperor, 'Allelujah! Don't Bend! Ascend! (October 1)

H
Hot Panda, Go Outside
Joshua Hyslop, Where the Mountain Meets the Valley

I
Islands, A Sleep & a Forgetting (February 14)

J
JBM, Stray Ashes
Japandroids, Celebration Rock
Carly Rae Jepsen, Curiosity
Carly Rae Jepsen, Kiss
July Talk, July Talk

K
Kalle Mattson, Lives in Between
Karkwa, Karkwa Live
Peter Katz, Still Mind Still
Mo Kenney, Mo Kenney
Kid Koala, 12 Bit Blues, (September 18)
Keith Kouna, Du plaisir et des bombes
K'naan, Country, God or the Girl, (October 16) 
K'naan, More Beautiful Than Silence (January 31)
Kristina Maria, Tell the World

L
Zachary Lucky, Saskatchewan

M
Madison Violet, The Good in Goodbye
Maestro Fresh Wes, Black Tuxedo EP (September 18)
Carolyn Mark, The Queen of Vancouver Island
Masia One, Bootleg Culture (June 19)
Matt Mays, Coyote
Eamon McGrath, Young Canadians	
Loreena McKennitt, Troubadours on the Rhine
Memoryhouse, The Slideshow Effect (February 28)
Metric, Synthetica (June 12)
METZ, METZ
Millimetrik, Read Between the Rhymes
Ariane Moffatt, MA
Mother Mother, The Sticks

N
Northern Haze, Sinaaktuq

O
Mike O'Neill, Wild Lines
Octoberman, Waiting in the Well
Ohbijou, Metal Meets
Karim Ouellet, Fox
Our Lady Peace, Curve (April 3)

P
Dorothea Paas, Same Sun
Doug Paisley, Golden Embers
Parlovr, Kook Soul
Pascale Picard Band, Trauma: Chansons de la série télé Saison 3
Dany Placard, Démon vert
Plants and Animals, The End of That (February 28)
Joel Plaskett, Scrappy Happiness (March 27)
PS I Love You, Death Dreams
Purity Ring, Shrines

R
Radio Radio, Havre de Grace (April 17)
Rah Rah, The Poet's Dead
Johnny Reid, Fire It Up
Rush, Clockwork Angels

S
Julien Sagot, Piano mal
Said the Whale, Little Mountain (March 6)
John K. Samson, Provincial (January 24)
Saukrates, Season One (April 24)
Crystal Shawanda, Just Like You
Shout Out Out Out Out, Spanish Moss and Total Loss (June 19)
Zal Sissokho, Le Partage
Skydiggers, Northern Shore (April 17)
The Slakadeliqs, The Other Side of Tomorrow
Smash Brovas, Think It's a Game? 
Dallas Smith, Jumped Right In - May 22
Rae Spoon, I Can't Keep All of Our Secrets (January 10)
Stars, The North
Jeffery Straker, Vagabond – October 2
Serena Ryder, Harmony

T
The Tragically Hip, Now for Plan A
A Tribe Called Red, A Tribe Called Red

V
Chad VanGaalen, The Green Corridor
Various Artists, Have Not Been the Same – November 13

W
Martha Wainwright, Come Home to Mama 
Rufus Wainwright, Out of the Game
Patrick Watson, Adventures in Your Own Backyard (April 17)
Wax Mannequin, No Safe Home
Whitehorse, The Fate of the World Depends on This Kiss
Wintersleep, Hello Hum
Royal Wood, We Were Born to Glory
The Wooden Sky, Every Child a Daughter, Every Moon a Sun (February 28)
Woodpigeon, For Paolo
Wool on Wolves, Measures of Progress

Y
Neil Young, Americana
Yukon Blonde, Tiger Talk – March 20

Z
Zeus, Busting Visions

Top hits on record 
The lists are updated weekly through Jam! and Nielsen Soundscan.

Top 10 Canadian albums

Top 10 American albums

Top 10 British albums

Top 10 International albums

Top 10 Singles

Canadian Hot 100 Year-End List

Deaths
January 2 – Ian Bargh, jazz pianist
January 25 – Andrew MacNaughtan, photographer and music video director
February 21 – Christopher Reimer, rock guitarist (Women)
April 23 – Billy Bryans, percussionist and record producer (Parachute Club)
September 23 – Sam Sniderman, founder of the Sam the Record Man chain

References